Litlington is a village and former civil parish, now in the parish of Cuckmere Valley, in the Wealden district, in the county of East Sussex, England. It is focussed  ENE of Seaford on the south coast. It was in a roughly square parish of dramatic chalkland that extends down to a natural coastline of pebble beach, Cuckmere Haven. In 1961 the parish had a population of 117. On 1 April 1990 the parish was abolished and merged with Lullington and Westdean to form Cuckmere Valley.

Toponymy
The name is Saxon, and literally means Litl's (followers or possibly family's) homestead. It is also potentially a corruption of Littleton but there is no evidence for its missing its -ing component.

Parish description
The village is small and like the rest of the parish, which extends to take in much of the Seven Sisters Country Park is on the left bank of a narrow valley in the signature narrow band of the South Downs National Park. It is downriver followed only by marshes mainly to its side of its road leading to hamlets of Exceat and Westdean but across the narrow road a narrow strip of fertile farmland that ascends rapidly into chalkland grazing.

Beyond the Exceat tiny cluster of homes is footpath access to Cuckmere Haven, which has road access from the west, Seaford only, a natural shoreline of pebbles and the soon towering Seven Sisters cliffs to the east.  Among features of the landscape here are sheep fields and pillboxes from World War II.

Civic, community buildings and river sports
Near the narrow, hedge-lined village street, on its offshoot Clapham Lane, is a community hall, built in 1953.

The church is in the opposite direction, medieval and dedicated to St Michael the Archangel.  The Church of England's ecclesiastical parish remains Lilington which has this church and no chapels.

Exceat has a canoe club and a separate paddleboarding experience/outings business.

Notable residents
 
Maria Fitzherbert, mistress of George IV, lived at Clapham House.

Economy
Main businesses are a brewery, a crystal and gemstone store, and The Plough & Harrow, a large gastropub-type restaurant.

Litlington White Horse
 

During the 19th century, The Litlington White Horse, being a large chalk figure of a horse was cut into the face of the downs, being situated to the west of the village.  The figure, the Litlington White Horse, replaced an earlier period of one present many years before. It is one of the nine white horse figures outside Wiltshire, and was the solution to a treasure hunt in the video game Pimania. North of the parish is the Long Man of Wilmington, famous in part because of its unknown origin.

References

External links

Villages in East Sussex
Former civil parishes in East Sussex
Wealden District